The discography of South Korean singer K.Will consists of four studio albums, six extended plays, and thirty-two singles.

Studio albums

Extended plays

Singles

As lead artist

Collaborative singles

As featured artist

Soundtrack appearances

Other charted songs

Music video

Notes

References

Discographies of South Korean artists
K-pop discographies